Sulham is a village in West Berkshire, England. The larger village of Tidmarsh is adjacent to Sulham on the west side, with Tilehurst on the east side.

Governance
The two villages of Sulham and Tidmarsh share the combined civil parish of Tidmarsh with Sulham with most local government functions carried out by the West Berkshire council.

Geography
From the west, Sulham is surrounded by the civil parishes of Tidmarsh, Pangbourne, Purley-on-Thames and Tilehurst to the east. To the south is Theale which has the local roads' junction with the M4 motorway. Sulham Woods is a Site of Special Scientific Interest and forms one side of the village. Features include many chalk pits and open rolling fields. The village is dominated by the Sulham Hall estate in the north and is spread out along Sulham Lane which stretches between Pangbourne and Theale, parallel to the River Pang.

Landmarks
Sulham House is a Grade II listed country house and was built about 1710. This has been the home of the Wilder family and their descendants since 1712. They have owned or rented estates in the parish since 1497. A feature of the parish and estate is the elevated Wilder's Folly, a  tower built in 1768 by Reverend Henry Wilder of Sulham House and later used as a dovecote. The ecclesiastical parish church of St Nicholas, built in 1836, stands next to the house and is Grade II listed. This is the main settled area of the village. Sulham Farmhouse is a Grade II* listed building.

References

External links

Villages in Berkshire
West Berkshire District
Civil parishes in Berkshire
Former civil parishes in Berkshire